Miracle in Cell No. 7 (lit. "A Gift from Room 7") is a 2013 South Korean comedy-drama film starring Ryu Seung-ryong, Kal So-won and Park Shin-hye. The film is about a mentally challenged man wrongfully imprisoned for murder, who builds friendships with the hardened criminals in his cell, who in return help him see his daughter again by smuggling her into the prison.

The movie is based on the real-life story of a man who was tortured and pleaded guilty under duress to the rape and murder of a 9-year-old girl on September 27, 1972 in Chuncheon before being finally exonerated in November 2008. Its early working title was December 23.

Plot
Ye-sung is a lawyer defending her late father for a crime he did not commit. While leaving the prison court after a successful trial, Ye-sung notices a balloon caught on barbed wire and reminisces about the past.

Back in 1997, 6-year-old Ye-sung and her father, Yong-go (who is mentally disabled), stare into a store window admiring a Sailor Moon backpack. Yong-gu promises to buy Ye-sung the backpack when he gets paid. However, the police commissioner and his daughter purchased it before Yong-gu. When Yong-gu rushes in to grab the backpack, he is assaulted by the police commissioner and kicked out of the store. After the incident, the two return home without the bag, slightly battered, but in high spirits. The next day, after work, the commissioner’s daughter spots Yong-gu and tries to show him another store selling the same backpack. In an unfortunate accident, the little girl slips running on the market’s icy pavement and a brick drops on her head, killing her. Yong-gu is arrested for rape and murder after his futile attempts at CPR are misconstrued by a female bystander.

Yong-gu is sent to prison, where he shares a jail cell (titled "Room 7") with five other inmates, all who initially dislike him for his falsely accused crime and mental disability. One day, Yong-gu saves the life of his cellmate and prison gang leader, So Yang-ho, from being stabbed by a rival prison gang leader. Touched at this, Yang-ho then offers to help Yong-gu in any way he can to return the favor. Yong-gu tells Yang-ho that he wants to see his daughter Ye-sung. The inmates successfully smuggle Ye-sung into the prison when her choir visits the prison for a performance. Ye-sung is introduced to her dad’s cell mates and manages to stay for a night, but is inadvertently found by the warden. Eventually, the warden realises that Yong-gu is not the assailant of the girl after Yong-gu saves him from an attempted arson, and allows Ye-sung to visit Yong-gu everyday after school.

Before the trial takes place, Yong-gu is trained by the Room 7 inmates on how to answer potential prosecution questions and he becomes proficient in answering them. Unfortunately, the commissioner beats Yong-gu before the trial in a fit of rage, threatening to kill his daughter if he does not confess. Left with no other choice, Yong-gu sacrifices himself by lying that he killed the commissioner's daughter to protect Ye-sung. Yong-gu is then sentenced to death and the execution date is scheduled for December 23, which happens to fall on Ye-sung's birthday. Feeling sorry for Yong-gu, the inmates decide to build a hot air balloon for Yong-gu to escape. During a prison concert, the inmates send Yong-gu and Ye-sung on the balloon while the guards pretend to be overwhelmed, but the balloon's rope is caught by barbed wire. On the day of Yong-gu's execution, the inmates and Yong-gu celebrate Ye-sung's birthday before he is executed.

In court 16 years later (in the present), Ye-sung, the prison warden and the Room 7 inmates all attend Yong-gu's trial to prove his innocence. The judge exonerates Yong-gu by overturning the previous verdict and granting him a posthumous acquittal, as well as a court order to re-investigate the girl's death, to the joy of the former Room 7 inmates, the warden, and tearful Ye-sung. The scene then returns to the beginning of the film, where Ye-sung has a vision of Yong-gu and her younger self on the hot air balloon waving goodbye. She tearfully says goodbye to her father as the balloon flies away.

Cast
 Ryu Seung-ryong as Lee Yong-gu
 Kal So-won as young Lee Ye-sung
 Park Shin-hye as adult Lee Ye-sung
 Oh Dal-su as So Yang-ho
 Jung Jin-young as Jang Min-hwan
 Park Won-sang as Choi Chun-ho
 Kim Jung-tae as Kang Man-beom
 Jung Man-sik as Shin Bong-shik
 Kim Ki-cheon as Old man Da-do
 Kang Ye-seo as Choi Ji-yeon (cameo)

Box office
The film took 4.6 million admissions (the equivalent of more than ) in its first two weeks due to strong word of mouth. Despite the release of The Berlin File, it drew in 15% more audience members on its third week, with seat booking at 75.8%. 32 days after its release, it became only the eighth film in Korean cinema history to break the 10 million mark in ticket sales. This was especially notable since Miracle in Cell No. 7 had a modest budget with a break-even point of 1.7 million admissions, making its eventual profit the highest among the films that reached 10 million.

The film exceeded 12 million viewers 46 days after its release. On March 15, 2013, 52 days after its release, ticket sales reached 12.32 million, making it the seventh highest grossing Korean film of all time.

Analysts say among the reasons for its success was the long lunar new year holiday and families going to see the film in groups. The film proved to be especially popular among middle-aged and elderly Koreans.

Awards and nominations

Remakes
The film was adapted into a Kannada movie in 2017 titled Pushpaka Vimana.
Kross Pictures to produce the official Hindi remake of the movie in collaboration with Indian Film Studios and was directed by Umesh Shukla.

It was also adapted in 2019 in Turkey as 7. Koğuştaki Mucize starring Aras Bulut İynemli in the lead role. This is an entirely dramatic interpretation and adds several story elements and characters. The film was also adapted in the Philippines with the same title, starring Aga Muhlach, Bela Padilla and Xia Vigor. Indonesia adapted the film with the same title in 2022, while remakes are being planned in Spain, and the United States.

References

External links
  
 
 
 

2013 films
2013 comedy-drama films
South Korean comedy-drama films
South Korean courtroom films
South Korean prison films
Films shot in Seoul
Films shot in Daejeon
Next Entertainment World films
2010s Korean-language films
Films directed by Lee Hwan-kyung
Films about miscarriage of justice
South Korean legal films
South Korean films remade in other languages
2013 comedy films
Films about father–daughter relationships
2010s South Korean films